Carcathiocerta was a city in Armenian Sophene near the Tigris, identified with the modern town of Eğil. It was the first capital of Sophene until Arsames I founded the new capital Arshamshat around 230 BCE. The Seleucid king Antiochus IV Epiphanes renamed the city into Epiphania. Strabo in his Geography, calls it "The royal city of Sophene". It was assigned to the late Roman province of Mesopotamia. It also bore the names Artagigarta, Baras, Basileon Phrourion, and Ingila. Under the name Ingila, it became a bishopric; no longer the seat of a residential bishop, it remains a titular see of the Roman Catholic Church.

Its site is located at Eğil in Asiatic Turkey.

References

Populated places in ancient Sophene
Former populated places in Turkey
Roman towns and cities in Turkey
Populated places of the Byzantine Empire
History of Diyarbakır Province